Barmouth railway station served the village of Articlave and the surrounding area in County Londonderry in Northern Ireland.

The Londonderry and Coleraine Railway opened the station on 1 May 1855.

The station was some distance from any urban settlements, and was very lightly used. It closed on 1 February 1856. The station building still stands and is used as a private residence.

Routes

References

Disused railway stations in County Londonderry
Railway stations opened in 1855
Railway stations closed in 1856
1855 establishments in Ireland
Railway stations in Northern Ireland opened in the 19th century